Soren may refer to:

Søren, a given name of Scandinavian origin, also spelled Sören
Suren (disambiguation), a Persian name also rendered as Soren
3864 Søren, main belt asteroid
Sōren, also known as Chongryon and Zai-Nihon Chōsenjin Sōrengōka, an organisation of Koreans in Japan
Sören, a village in Germany
Soren, a barn owl who is the protagonist in the Guardians of Ga'Hoole children's fantasy book series
Soren, a fictional character and member of the Skrull alien species
 Soren the Architect, the leader of The Order of the Stone in Minecraft: Story Mode
 Soren, a member of the Greil Mercenaries in Fire Emblem: Path of Radiance
Søren (band), an Italian darkfolk/new wave band

People with the name
Søren Kierkegaard (born 1813), Danish philosopher
Durga Soren, Indian politician
Shibu Soren (born 1944), Indian politician

See also 
Soran, chief antagonist of Star Trek Generations